Margaret Smith Polson (née Murray; Paisley July 20, 1865 – January 27, 1927 Montreal), better known as Margaret Polson Murray, was a Canadian social reformer, magazine editor and founder of the Imperial Order Daughters of the Empire.

Notes

References

Bibliography

 

1865 births
1927 deaths
Canadian magazine editors
Women magazine editors
Social reformers